Palnati Yuddham is a 1966 Indian Telugu-language historical war film directed by G. Ramineedu. It stars N. T. Rama Rao, Bhanumathi with music composed by S. Rajeswara Rao. The film is based on the Battle of Palnadu which occurred in Palnadu region in   CE. It was produced by T. Hanumantha Rao, Y. Lakshmaiah Chowdary, and D. Suryanarayana under the Sri Anurupa Films banner. The film was first made under the same title in 1947. It received the Certificate of Merit for Best Feature Film in Telugu at the 13th National Film Awards.

Plot
The film begins with Palnadu's Chief Minister Brahmanaidu and his wife Ithamba are blessed with a baby boy after many years. They name the child Balachandra and at the naming ceremony the entire capital city Gurajala was filled with joy. King Nalagamaraju himself visited along with his brother Narasimharaju and their stepmother Vidhyala Devi. But unfortunately, according to the child's horoscope, the astrologers predict that he would create huge destruction of war in Palnadu. So, Brahmanaidu orders his henchmen to kill the child, but the child was protected by Brahmanaidu's brother-in-law Kannamma Naidu, who secretly raised him.

At the same time, Palnadu saw flash floods. Progressive-minded Brahmanaidu allows Scheduled Caste people Harijans entry into temples and appoints a Harijan, Kannama Dasu as his commander and chief. This irks the upper caste people's head Gopamantri, so he decides to take revenge against Brahmanaidu, for which he uses a powerful woman, Nayakuralu Nagamma. Nagamma has an edict that she can rule the kingdom for three days, which was given by king Anuguraju. Using the edict, Nagamma creates a lot of destruction within the kingdom and also corrupts King Nalagamaraju's mind, due to which Brahmanaidu has to leave his position.
 
On hearing this, Raja Maata Vidyaladevi also decides to leave the kingdom, she asks Nalagamaraju to divide the kingdom and give the share to his son Malidevadulu. So, Macharla has been given to Malideva.  Malideva and Vidhyala Devi along with her brother Kommaraju leave for Macharla. Years roll by, and under Brahmanaidu's guidance, Macharla develops as another progressive capital that hurts Nagamma. Here she plans to grab the Macharla kingdom by creating a conspiracy. She performs Nalagamaraju's daughter Peerindevi's marriage with Kommaraju's son Alaraju. The next day after the marriage ceremony, Nagamma incites Malideva for a rooster fight (Kodi Pandalu) on the condition that whoever loses the gamble must leave the kingdom and live incognito for seven years. Nagamma cheats to win and Malideva has to leave his kingdom.

Meanwhile, Brahmanaidu discovers that his son Balachandra is alive and he again tries to kill him. But at the request of his wife and brother-in-law, he calms down and accepts Balachandra as his son. Concurrently, Balachandra's marriage is performed with Kanamma Naidu's daughter Maguva Manchala. Time passes, and after the exile of seven years, Brahmanaidu sends Alaraju as a mediator for negotiations to give back their kingdom to Malideva. Using Narasimharaju as a weapon, Nagamma kills Alaraju by poisoning, Peerindevi also makes Sathi with him, before dying she takes a word from Balachandra to kill Narasimharaju. Brahmanaidu sends another person to negotiate on the condition that to give back the kingdom with Narasimharaju's head. But the negotiations fail and the battle begins at Karampuudi, except Brahmanaidu, Nagamma, Nalagamaraju, and Kanamma Dasu, everyone dies in the war. In the end, Nagamma also realizes her mistake and bows her head down before Brahmanaidu. Finally, Brahmanaidu hands over the kingdom to Nalagamaraju, making Nagamma as chief minister and Kanamma Dasu as chief commander, and leaves to the forest for penance.

Cast
N. T. Rama Rao as Palnati Brahmanaidu
Bhanumathi as Nayakuralu Nagamma
Kanta Rao as Alaraju
Haranath as Balachandrudu
Gummadi as Nalagaama Raju
Rajanala as Narasimha Raju
M. Balaiah as Malidevadulu
Mikkilineni as Kannama Naidu
Mukkamala as Kommaraju
K. V. S. Sarma as Gopa Mantri
Prabhakar Reddy as Kannama Dasu
Tyagaraju as Veerabhadrudu
Anjali Devi as Ithamba	
Jamuna as Maguva Manchala
Hemalatha as Vidyala Devi
Chayadevi as Rekhanba
L. Vijayalakshmi as Subbai	
Vasanthi as Peerindevi

Soundtrack

Music composed by S. Rajeswara Rao.

Awards
The film won National Film Award for Best Feature Film in Telugu - certificate of merit in 1967. Also Bhanumathi received the Rashtrapati Award for her role.

References

See also
 Palnati Yuddham (1947 film)

Films set in the 12th century
1960s Telugu-language films
1966 films
Indian war films
Films set in Andhra Pradesh
History of India on film
Indian films based on actual events
Indian historical films
1960s historical films
Films scored by S. Rajeswara Rao
Films directed by Gutha Ramineedu